Varvara Lepchenko was the defending champion, but retired in the first round against CoCo Vandeweghe.

Katerina Stewart won the title, defeating Shelby Rogers in an all-American final, 6–7(2–7), 6–3, 6–2.

Seeds

Draw

Finals

Top half

Bottom half

References

Main Draw

Mercer Tennis Classic - Singles